In enzymology, a N-acylglucosamine 2-epimerase is an enzyme that catalyzes the chemical reaction

N-acyl-D-glucosamine  N-acyl-D-mannosamine

Hence, this enzyme has one substrate, N-acyl-D-glucosamine, and one product, N-acyl-D-mannosamine.

This enzyme belongs to the family of isomerases, specifically those racemases and epimerases acting on carbohydrates and derivatives.  The systematic name of this enzyme class is N-acyl-D-glucosamine 2-epimerase. Other names in common use include acylglucosamine 2-epimerase, and N-acetylglucosamine 2-epimerase.  This enzyme participates in aminosugars metabolism.  It employs one cofactor, ATP.

Structural studies

They show that the N-acylglucosamine 2-epimerase monomer folds as a barrel composed of α-helices, in a manner known as (α/α)6-barrel. The structures are presented as dimers, with the structures from Sus scrofa and Anabaena sp. CH1 having a different organization than the structure from Nostoc sp. KJV10.

References 

 

EC 5.1.3
Enzymes of known structure